Simon III de Montfort (1117 – 13 March 1181), called the Bold, was count of Évreux from 1140 until 1181 and the seigneur de Montfort-l'Amaury from 1137 to 1181.  He was the son of Amaury III the seigneur de Montfort-l'Amaury and count of Evreux and Agnès de Garlande, daughter of Anseau de Garlande.

Life
The Montforts were the vassals of the king of France for Montfort and also vassals to the king of England (in their capacity as Dukes of Normandy) for Évreux.  Due to this, the Montforts were caught between the rivalry of the two kingdoms.  Amaury III had attempted to solve this problem by leaving Évreux to his eldest son Amaury IV and Montfort to his youngest son Simon III.   However, Amaury IV died three years after his father, which resulted in the reunification of the two domains.

Simon III chose to side with the English king and gave him the strongholds of Montfort, Rochefort and Epernon.  Because of this, Louis VII, King of France, "could not come and go freely from Paris to Orleans or to Etampes because the Normans had been established by King Henry in the castles of the counts of Evreux".

Later, Simon III was reconciled with Louis VII, who gave him custody of the Castle of Saint-Léger-en-Yvelines.

Marriage and Children
Simon married Matilda, and had:
Amaury III († c. 1190), count of Évreux
Simon († 1188), lord of Montfort
Bertrade, married to Hugh de Kevelioc, 5th Earl of Chester

References

Bibliography

1181 deaths
Counts of Évreux
Seigneur of Montfort
1117 births